Karl Kowanz (15 April 1926 – 30 November 1997) was an Austrian footballer and coach. He played for Austria at the 1948 Summer Olympics. Karl Kowanz was the father of the internationally renowned artist Brigitte Kowanz.

References

External links
 
Austria Archiv 
Sturm Archiv 

1926 births
1997 deaths
Austrian footballers
Austria international footballers
Association football defenders
Olympic footballers of Austria
Footballers at the 1948 Summer Olympics
Austrian football managers
FK Austria Wien players
Grazer AK managers
SK Sturm Graz managers